Seyyedan (also Romanized as Sayyedān, Saidan, Saydan, and Seyyedān) is a village in Dasht-e Veyl Rural District, Rahmatabad and Blukat District, Rudbar County, Gilan Province, Iran. At the 2006 census, its population was 194, in 48 families.

References 

Populated places in Rudbar County